Pál Pálffy ab Erdőd (19 January 1592 Castle of Vöröskő, Kingdom of Hungary – 26 November 1653 Pressburg, Kingdom of Hungary) was a Hungarian noble and Palatine of Hungary.

Life 
Pál Pálffy de Erdőd, was the fourth son of Miklós Pálffy ab Erdőd and Maria von Fugger, daughter of Markus Fugger from the wealthy Fugger family.

He was Geheimrat, Chamberlain, the first Perpetual count of Pozsony County and Captain of the Royal Castle (in Pressburg, today Bratislava, Slovakia). Between 1646 and 1649 he was Judge royal under Emperor Ferdinand III. In 1649 he became Palatine of Hungary and in 1650 Knight in the Order of the Golden Fleece.

He married on 26 July 1629 with Franziska Khuen von Belasi (died 1672) and had three children:
 János III Antal (1642–1694), Perpetual count of Pozsony County
 János IV Károly (1645–1694), Fieldmarshal in Milano
 Mária Magdolna (died 1684), married August von Zinzendorf and Fernando degli Obizzi, no issue.

References

External links 

 
 Taschenbuch für die vaterländische Geschichte, Wien 1828

Hungarian nobility
1580s births
1653 deaths
Knights of the Golden Fleece
Palatines of Hungary
Judges royal
Masters of the cupbearers